Bussi is a surname. Notable people with the surname include:

 Antonio Domingo Bussi (1926-2011), Argentine Army general and politician
 Carlo Antonio Bussi (1658–1690), Swiss painter
 Giovanni Andrea Bussi (1417-1475), Italian Renaissance humanist and bishop
 Giovanni Battista Bussi (disambiguation), multiple people
 Michel Bussi (born 1965), French writer, political analyst and professor of Geography
 Hortensia Bussi (1914-2009), widow of assassinated Chilean President Salvador Allende and political exile
 Vittoria Bussi (born 1987), Italian professional racing cyclist

See also
 Bussie